Spitting Venom is the debut, self-released EP from English heavy metal band Savage Messiah. It was released on 1 October 2007 on SMR Productions.

Track listing

References

2007 albums
Savage Messiah (band) albums